Ajan Faquir Saheb (Assamese: আজান ফকীৰ চাহেব) is an Assamese language biographical film produced by Bani Kalita and directed by Asif Iqbal Hussain. The film was released on 25 April 2008. The film is based on the life of Ajan Fakir, the Sufi saint and poet who came to Assam from Baghdad.

Production
Both Bishnu Kharghoria and Jayanta Bhagawati had to learn things like offering namaj besides learning some words of Urdu and Arabic to play the characters effectively.

Cast and characters
Bishnu Kharghoria  as Azan Fakir,
Prithviraj Rabha as Nabi Pir
Jayanta Bhagawati as Moulabi
Arun Nath as Gadadhar Singha, the Ahom king
Moloya Goswami as Jaymati Kunwari, the queen

Awards
Awards received by the film are:
Chitralekha Award of the United TV and Filmmakers Association for Best Assamese Film of 2008
Best director – Asif Iqbal
Best music director – Dwijen Konwar
Best screenplay writer – Prabhat Goswami
Best supporting actress – Malaya Goswami.

See also
Jollywood

References

External links
 "New Assamese Film, Ajan Fakir Saheb‚ to be released shortly" Assam Times, 4 August 2007.

2008 films
Films set in Assam
2000s Assamese-language films